Adventures of Huckleberry Finn is a novel by Mark Twain. It was 1st published on December 10, 1884 in England and was republished in the United States in February 1885

Adventures of Huckleberry Finn may also refer to:
The Adventures of Huckleberry Finn (1939 film), starring Mickey Rooney
The Adventures of Huckleberry Finn (1955 film)
The Adventures of Huckleberry Finn (1960 film), directed by Michael Curtiz and starring Eddie Hodges
"The Adventures of Huckleberry Finn", a 1955 episode of the TV anthology series Climax!
The Adventures of Huck Finn (1993 film), starring Elijah Wood and Courtney B. Vance

See also
The New Adventures of Huckleberry Finn, a 1968 live action/animated television series
Huckleberry no Bōken, a 1976 Japanese anime
Huckleberry Finn and His Friends (1979 TV series), starring Ian Tracey
Tom and Huck, a 1995 film starring Jonathan Taylor Thomas and Brad Renfro
 Huckleberry Finn (disambiguation)